The Altemberg is a mountain in the Pennine Alps of north-western Italy; with an elevation of  is the highest peak of the Alpi Cusiane.

Toponymy 

The name of the mountain is connected to the Walser German, a language spoken by people who settled into the upper valley of the Strona and Sesia centuries ago. In German Alten means old while Berg means hill or mountain, so the English meaning of the name could be old mountain (vecchia montagna in Italian).

Geography 

The Altemberg is located on the water divide between Strona and Sesia valleys, South of the Bocchetta Stretta pass, which divides it from the neighbouring Cima Lago. Towards SE the ridge goes on with a saddle named Bocchetta delle Vacche and the Cima del Pizzo (2,233 m). Administratively the mountain belongs to both the comunes of Rimella (West of the summit) and Valstrona. On its summit stands a metallic cross.

SOIUSA classification 

According to the SOIUSA (International Standardized Mountain Subdivision of the Alps) the mountain can be classified in the following way:
 main part = Western Alps
 major sector = North Western Alps
 section = Pennine Alps
 subsection = Southern  Valsesia Alps
 supergroup = Alpi Cusiane
 group = Costiera Capio-Massa del Turlo
 code = I/B-9.IV-B.3

Access to the summit 
The Altemberg can be accessed following a foothpath from Campello Monti, a village in the comune of Valstrona, or from Rimella, in Valsesia. The ridge between connecting the Altemberg with Cima Lago needs some climbing skill to be crossed and is rated as PD grade

Nature conservation 
Cima Altemberg is part of the regional park of Alta Val Sesia e dell'Alta Val Strona.

References

External links

Mountains of the Alps
Mountains of Piedmont
Pennine Alps
Two-thousanders of Italy